Simon Dufour (born 20 February 1979) is an Olympic backstroke swimmer from France. He has swum for France at:
Olympics: 2000, 2004, 2008
World Championships: 2003, 2005, 2007
European Championships: 2004
World University Games: 2001
Mediterranean Games: 2001
Short Course Europeans: 2001, 2006

See also
 Dufour's entry on French Wikipedia

References

1979 births
Living people
French male backstroke swimmers
Olympic swimmers of France
Swimmers at the 2000 Summer Olympics
Swimmers at the 2004 Summer Olympics
Swimmers at the 2008 Summer Olympics
European Aquatics Championships medalists in swimming
Universiade medalists in swimming
Mediterranean Games silver medalists for France
Mediterranean Games bronze medalists for France
Mediterranean Games medalists in swimming
Swimmers at the 2001 Mediterranean Games
Universiade silver medalists for France
Medalists at the 2001 Summer Universiade
20th-century French people
21st-century French people